Nehuyeh (also Romanized as Nehūyeh; also known as Nūhūyeh and Tohūyeh) is a village in Mobarakabad Rural District, in the Central District of Qir and Karzin County, Fars Province, Iran. At the 2006 census, its population was 471, in 111 families.

References 

Populated places in Qir and Karzin County